Prince Frederick William of Schleswig-Holstein-Sonderburg-Augustenburg-Horetonburg (18 November 16683 June 1714) was a member of the House of Oldenburg and a Prince of Schleswig-Holstein-Sonderburg-Augustenburg.

He was the youngest son of Duke Ernest Günther, Duke of Schleswig-Holstein-Sonderburg-Augustenburg and his wife, Auguste of Schleswig-Holstein-Sonderburg-Glücksburg. In 1675, when his father negotiated with Count Peder Griffenfeld about a marriage with Frederick William's sister, he was promised a profitable post as provost of the Cathedral in Hamburg and governor of Als. He was appointed as provost in Hamburg in 1676, after chairman Kielmansegge died. When his father died in 1689, the will stated that his possessions would go to his widow, who would have the right to settle the succession. She made a decision, which was upheld by the King in 1692. Her eldest living son, Ernest Augustus, was excluded from the inheritance, because he had converted to Catholicism, leaving the Duchy to Frederick William, who was by then the only other surviving son. Almost simultaneously, Frederick William was also appointed governor of Sønderborg.

However, when Ernest Augustus reverted to Lutheranism in 1695, he was appointed governor of Sønderborg, because he resided there. Ernest Augustus was also reinstated as heir of Schleswig-Holstein-Sonderburg-Augustenburg. Nevertheless, when Ernest Augustus died childless in 1731, Frederick William's son Christian August I would inherit the duchy.

When his mother died in 1701, Frederick William inherited Augustenborg Palace, Rumohrsgaard Manor and Evelgunde Manor. In 1703, he purchased Avnbølgaard Manor in Sundeved.

Frederick William served as a Major General in the Danish army.

On 27 November 1694, he married Sophie Amalie, a daughter of the Chancellor, Frederik Ahlefeldt, Count of Langeland. She died on 24 December 1741.

References 
 Jonathan Smith: Zur Geschichte des oldenburgischen Heerwesen während der Dänenzeit (1667-1773). In: Oldenburger Jahrbücher. 1940/41, S. 52ff, Digitalisat

House of Augustenburg
Danish generals
17th-century Danish people
1668 births
1714 deaths
17th-century Danish nobility
18th-century Danish nobility